BDC may mean:

Business and finance

Becton, Dickinson and Company, a medical products manufacturer
Business Data Catalog
Business Development Bank of Canada
Business Development Company - is a publicly traded private equity tax-advantaged investment company in the US investing in small and mid-sized businesses
BDC Aero Industrie, a Canadian aircraft manufacturer based in Lachute, Quebec

Other
Backup Domain Controller
Beat Down Clan - a heel wrestling stable in Total Nonstop Action Wrestling
Beck Depression Checklist or Burns Depression Checklist, both of which are associated with the Beck Depression Inventory
Berlin Document Center
Binary Delta Compression
Bishop Druitt College, a K-12 school situated in Coffs Harbour, New South Wales, Australia
Black Diamond Conference, an Illinois high school athletic conference
Boolean Differential Calculus, a subject field of Boolean algebra discussing changes of Boolean variables and functions
Bottom dead centre, the position of a piston when it is nearest a crankshaft
Brian Deer Classification System
British Dance Council
Broadway Dance Center
Bullet drop compensation
Bellini duct carcinoma, a rare type of cancer that affects the Bellini duct of the kidney. 
Terephthalic acid, benzene-1,4-dicarboxylic acid, abbreviated BDC
BDC (group)